Josy Gyr-Steiner (10 October 1949 – 18 April 2007) was a Swiss politician from the Canton of Schwyz and member of the Swiss National Council (2003–2007).

In 2003, Gyr was elected to the National Council on the list of the Social Democratic Party of Switzerland (SPS/PSS). She was on the Council's Control Committee and on the Committee for Public Buildings.

Suffering from pancreatic cancer, Gyr resigned on 10 April 2007, and died a few days later.

External links

Eulogy by Christine Egerszegi, President of the National Council 

1949 births
Members of the National Council (Switzerland)
Social Democratic Party of Switzerland politicians
2007 deaths
Women members of the National Council (Switzerland)
21st-century Swiss women politicians
21st-century Swiss politicians